The Emerald class or E class was a class of two light cruisers built for the Royal Navy. Following the Cavendish class, three ships of a new class were ordered in March 1918, towards the end of World War I, designed to emphasise high speed at the cost of other qualities, for use against rumoured new high-speed German cruisers – like the  – and particularly minelayers, in the North Sea. The third ship was cancelled in November 1918.

Design
The E class were based on the preceding , itself based on the C-class cruiser but had a very high ratio of length to beam and only one more gun, despite being much bigger and more expensive. Only two ships were built, being completed in 1926. Four propellers were necessary for the increased power and were driven from two engine rooms. There were four boiler rooms, nos. 2 and 3 being arranged side-by-side with the exhausts trunked into a common funnel. The magazines were between boiler rooms nos. 2 and 3 and the forward engine room and between boiler room no. 4 and the after engine room.

 was completed with a prototype twin  turret in place of her two forward single mounts. The trials of the turret were successful and it was retained on Enterprise for the rest of her career. The bridge was of a new design, being a single block topped by a director tower, rather than the traditional platforms built around the foremast and wheelhouse topped with a spotting top. This design of bridge would appear in the s.

Notwithstanding their age and outlandish appearance, the two ships were the fastest cruisers in the Royal Navy at the outbreak of World War II, Emerald exceeding  in a full-power trial at full load in 1939. Both cruisers also carried the heaviest torpedo armament of any Royal Navy cruiser – four quadruple mounts. These cruisers had a long range, unlike the C- and Danae-class cruisers, making them valuable for patrolling sea lanes against Axis merchant raiders. They were also large enough that they could accommodate significant additions to their anti-aircraft armament as well as modern radar suites.

Modifications

In the mid-1930s both ships were fitted with a catapult which replaced the outmoded flying-off platform and had HACS Mk.I added for the  guns, which was fitted amidships between the searchlight platform and the after funnel. The funnels were raised . Later proposals to increase the AA outfit by the addition of twin 4-inch and multiple 2-pounder guns were thwarted by the outbreak of war. Emerald had received two quadruple .5 machine guns before the war, then during refit between August 1942 and April 1943 she landed the after 6 in, two 2 pounder singles and the .5 machine guns to receive instead six power-operated twin  and two quadruple 2 pounder guns and radars Type 273 (centimetric target indication), 281 (air warning), 282 (pom-pom ranging) and 285 (HACS ranging). In April 1944 six  single mounts were added and the catapult was removed.

Enterprise landed two  singles in 1941 and had one quadruple 2 pounder fitted. She later had four single  fitted and then, in the course of a long refit between the end of December 1942 and October 1943, she lost the single 2 pounder and  weapons, receiving six twin power-operated mountings in lieu. The two  were reinstated and a second quadruple 2 pounder fitted. She was fitted with radars Type 272 (centimetric target indication), 281, 282, 284 (6 inch gun ranging), and 285. In February she had an additional four single  fitted and the catapult was removed.

Ships

Service history
Like the Cavendish class, they were mainly employed on the ocean trade routes, also seeing fleet service in the Far East in 1942–43 with the East Indies Fleet.  Unlike almost all of the other older cruisers, both ships had active employment until the last few months of the war, in almost every theatre. Enterprise served in Force H in 1940 when that naval task force bombarded the French naval squadron in the Attack on Mers-el-Kébir in July 1940. Enterprise after her 1942–43 refit served with the Home Fleet where, in company with the cruiser , she participated in the Battle of the Bay of Biscay against a well-armed German destroyer and torpedo boat force in December 1943 in the Bay of Biscay. Emerald supported British forces in their campaign putting down the pro-German revolt in Iraq in the summer of 1941. Both cruisers provided gunfire support in the Invasion of Normandy in June 1944. Both cruisers were reduced to reserve by January 1945; Enterprise was reactivated for use in trooping duties upon the ending of the war.

References

Bibliography

External links

 Emerald class at U-boat.net

Cruiser classes
 
Ship classes of the Royal Navy